Tatiana Cristabel Terezón Sosa (born 23 April 1995) is a Salvadoran footballer who plays as a midfielder for CD FAS and El Salvador women's national team.

Club career
Terezón has played for FAS in El Salvador.

International career
Terezón capped for El Salvador at senior level during the 2018 CONCACAF Women's Championship qualification and the 2020 CONCACAF Women's Olympic Qualifying Championship qualification.

See also
List of El Salvador women's international footballers

References

1995 births
Living people
Salvadoran women's footballers
Women's association football midfielders
El Salvador women's international footballers